Ray Hicks (3 March 1917 – 12 January 1974) was a British cyclist. He competed in the sprint and time trial events at the 1936 Summer Olympics.

References

External links
 

1917 births
1974 deaths
British male cyclists
Olympic cyclists of Great Britain
Cyclists at the 1936 Summer Olympics
Place of birth missing
Commonwealth Games medallists in cycling
Commonwealth Games silver medallists for England
Cyclists at the 1938 British Empire Games
Medallists at the 1938 British Empire Games